The GHK algorithm (Geweke, Hajivassiliou and Keane) is an importance sampling method for simulating choice probabilities in the multivariate probit model. These simulated probabilities can be used to recover parameter estimates from the maximized likelihood equation using any one of the usual well known maximization methods (Newton's method, BFGS, etc.). Train has well documented steps for implementing this algorithm for a multinomial probit model. What follows here will applies to the binary multivariate probit model.

The  probability of observing choice  is 
 
 
Where  and,
 

Unless  is small (less than or equal to 2) there is no closed form solution for the integrals defined above (some work has been done with ). The alternative to evaluating these integrals closed form or by quadrature methods is to use simulation. GHK is a simulation method to simulate the probability above using importance sampling methods.

Evaluating  is simplified by recognizing that the latent data model  can be rewritten using a Cholesky factorization, . This gives  where the  terms are distributed .

  
Note:  , substituting:
 

Rearranging above, 
 

Now all one needs to do is iteratively draw from the truncated univariate normal distribution with the given bounds above. This can be done by the inverse CDF method and noting the truncated normal distribution is given by, 

Where  will be a number between 0 and 1 because the above is a CDF. This suggests to generate random draws from the truncated distribution one has to solve for  giving, 
 
 
Where  is the multivariate normal distribution.

The distribution function of a truncated normal is, 
 

Therefore,  has distribution, 

where  is the standard normal pdf for choice .

Because  the above standardization makes each term mean 0 variance 1.

Let the denominator  and the numerator  where  is the multivariate normal PDF.

Going back to the original goal, to evaluate the 

Using importance sampling we can evaluate this integral, 

References

Regression models